Simskoye (Eśem) is a rural locality (a selo) in Austrumsky Selsoviet, Iglinsky District, Bashkortostan, Russia. The population was 82 as of 2010. There are 2 streets.

Geography 
Simskoye is located 38 km southeast of Iglino (the district's administrative centre) by road. Voznesenka is the nearest rural locality.

References 

Rural localities in Iglinsky District